Omicron Delta Epsilon ( or ODE) is an international honor society in the field of economics, formed from the merger of Omicron Delta Gamma and Omicron Chi Epsilon,  in 1963.  Its board of trustees includes well-known economists such as Robert Lucas, Paul Romer, and Robert Solow. ODE is a member of the Association of College Honor Societies; the ACHS indicates that ODE inducts approximately 4,000 collegiate members each year and has more than 100,000 living lifetime members.  There are approximately 700 active ODE chapters worldwide.  New members consist of undergraduate and graduate students, as well as college and university faculty; the academic achievement required to obtain membership for students can be raised by individual chapters, as well as the ability to run for office or wear honors cords during graduation. It publishes an academic journal entitled The American Economist twice each year.

History 
The first national honor society in economics, Omicron Delta Gamma (ODG), was formed on May 7, 1915, by the merger of  Harvard University's Undergraduate Society of Economics  with the University of Wisconsin's Order of Artus, an economics student society modeled on King Arthur's Knights of the Roundtable.  Wisconsin's group was advised by Professor John R. Commons, and  Professor Frank W. Taussig,  president of the American Economic Association in 1904–1905, was faculty advisor for Harvard's  society.     The John R. Commons Award is given semi-annually to an outstanding economist for contributions to the profession and to ODE, while the Frank W. Taussig Research Paper Award is given annually to the winner of a national undergraduate student competition.

Alan A. Brown was the founder and first President of Omicron Chi Epsilon (OCE) in 1955 while a student at City College of New York.  Brown conceived the creation and the development of an international Honor Society in Economics. Friends and colleagues report that they were amazed watching this polite and deferring young person 'pestering' Nobel Prize winners and other giants of the economics profession to endorse, become involved in, and support this initiative.

The first annual meeting of OCE was held at Fordham University in New York City in the spring of 1958. Brown subsequently learned of the existence of ODG, which, while older and formally larger with more campus chapters, was less active than the younger OCE.  Brown was the prime mover to facilitate a merger in 1963 between the two societies, renamed Omicron Delta Epsilon – The National Honor Society in Economics. Later Brown replaced “National” with "International" in its non-Greek title and expanded the organization globally.  Brown served as chairman of the Board of Trustees of ODE from its inception until 1982.

A detailed history of ODE, written by long-serving Executive Secretary Treasurer of the organization William D. Gunther, was published in 2013 by The American Economist in recognition of its fiftieth birthday.

John R. Commons Award 
The John R. Commons Award, established in memory of Professor Commons, co-founder of Omicron Delta Gamma, is awarded biennially to an outstanding economist in recognition of academic achievements and for service both to the economics profession and to Omicron Delta Epsilon. The award is given at American Economic Association conference where the honoree presents a "Commons Lecture" which is later published in The American Economist. Over the years, the Commons Award has served as an indicator of recipients of the Nobel Memorial Prize in Economic Sciences. Eight Commons Award winners have won the Nobel Prize; most recently, Paul Romer (2016) won the Nobel in 2018.

Other notable members 
Notable alumni of the Omicron Delta Epsilon Society include:

Gregory Mankiw, Professor of Economics at Harvard University and Chairman of the Council of Economic Advisers, 2003–2005.
Robert Lucas Jr, 1995 Nobel Prize Laureate for investigations into the assumption of rational expectation.
Thomas Schelling, Nobel Prize-Winning Economist. Known for work in game theory and national security.
Thomas J. Sargent, Professor of Economics at New York University. Winner of the 2011 Nobel Prize in Economic Sciences.
Richard Thaler, Nobel Prize laureate for work  in behavioral economics.
Alvin E. Roth, 2012 Nobel laureate known for contributions to game theory and market design.
Avinash Dixit Emeritus Professor at Princeton University. Noted for contributions to public policy and development economics.

Chapters 
The Omicron Delta Epsilon Society has approximately 700 chapters located in the United States, including Puerto Rico and Guam; Mexico; Canada; France; the United Kingdom; Australia; Kazakhstan; South Africa; Egypt; and the United Arab Emirates.

References

Association of College Honor Societies
Honor societies
Student organizations established in 1955
1955 establishments in New York City